Krishan Lal Balmiki (10 July 1942 – 21 April 2010) was an Indian politician of the Bharatiya Janata Party and was a member of the Parliament of India representing Rajasthan in the Rajya Sabha, the upper house of the Indian Parliament.

References

External links
 Profile on Rajya Sabha website

2010 deaths
1942 births
Bharatiya Janata Party politicians from Rajasthan
Rajya Sabha members from Rajasthan
Rajasthani politicians
Rajya Sabha members from the Bharatiya Janata Party